Publishers Clearing House (PCH) is a direct marketing company that markets merchandise and magazine subscriptions with sweepstakes and prize-based games.

It was founded in 1953 by Harold Mertz to replace door-to-door magazine subscription sales by a single vendor offering multiple subscriptions by mail. It introduced its sweepstakes in 1967. In the early 1990s, the company was the subject of concerns and legal actions regarding whether consumers were misled about their odds of winning the sweepstakes and whether purchases increased their chances. By 2010, the company had reached settlements with all 50 states.

The company acquired search company Blingo in 2006, online gaming company Funtank in 2010, mobile marketing company Liquid Wireless in 2012, and internet news aggregator Topix in 2019.

History

Early history 
Publishers Clearing House was founded in 1953 in Port Washington, New York, by Harold Mertz, a former manager of a door-to-door sales team for magazine subscriptions. The company started in Mertz's basement with help from his first wife LuEsther and daughter Joyce. Its first mailings were of 10,000 envelopes from Mertz's home in Long Island, New York, and offered 20 magazine subscriptions. 100 orders were received. Within a few years the company moved out of Mertz's basement into an office building and started hiring staff. When PCH moved its headquarters in 1969, its prior location was donated to the city and renamed the Harold E. Mertz Community Center. The company revenue had grown to US$50 million by 1981, and $100 million by 1988.

In 1967 PCH started its first sweepstakes as a way to increase subscription sales, based on the sweepstakes held by Reader's Digest. The first prizes ranged from $1 to $10 and entrants had a 1 in 10 chance of winning. After the sweepstakes increased response rates to mailings, prizes of $5,000 and eventually $250,000 were offered. PCH began advertising the sweepstakes on TV in 1974. It was the only major multi-magazine subscription business until 1977. Former client Time Inc. and several other publishers formed American Family Publishers (AFP) to compete with PCH after the company refused repeated requests by Time for a larger share of sales revenue from magazine subscriptions.

AFP and PCH competed for exclusive rights to magazines and for the better promotion and prize ideas. When AFP increased their jackpot to $1 million, and then to $10 million in 1985, PCH raised its prizes to match. $7 million in prizes were distributed by 1979, $40 million by 1991, and $137 million by 2000. In 1989 two members of its advertising team, Dave Sayer and Todd Sloane, started the Prize Patrol, a publicized event where winners are surprised with a check at their home. The idea was inspired by the 1950s television series The Millionaire. The two companies were often mistaken for each other, with Star Search host Ed McMahon and The $25,000 Pyramid host Dick Clark, the spokespeople for AFP, mistaken for representatives of the better-known PCH.

In 1992 thousands of discarded sweepstakes entries from contestants who had not bought magazine subscriptions were found in the company's trash, reinforcing beliefs that the company favored those who made purchases in selecting a sweepstakes winner. PCH said this was done by a disgruntled employee at their mail processing vendor. A class action ensued, which PCH settled by giving discarded entrants a second chance to win.

Government regulation 
In the 1990s PCH and its primary competitor, AFP, experienced a series of legal troubles due to concerns that their mailings misled consumers about their odds of winning and implied that magazine purchases increased their chances. This led to the Deceptive Mail Prevention and Enforcement Act of 2000, which regulates direct mail businesses. At the senate hearings regarding this Act, PCH said most consumers were not confused about their chances of winning or that purchases did not increase their chances. The company said that fewer than five percent of participants spend more than $300. Government officials from California said 5,000 local consumers paid more than $2,500 each in magazine purchases under the false belief that they were increasing their odds of winning the sweepstakes.

Industry sources estimated PCH's response rates decreased by 7 to 12 percent and its sales volume by 22 to 30 percent in response to the bad publicity from the lawsuits. In 2000, PCH laid off a quarter of its 800-person work force.

Lawsuits and settlements 
In 1994 PCH sent mailings telling recipients they were all "finalists", which led to a lawsuit involving the attorneys general of 14 US states. Later that year, PCH denied wrongdoing, but agreed to pay a settlement of $490,000 and to change their practices. Under the agreement, PCH said it would define terms like "finalist" and disclose the chances of winning.

In 1997, a contestant of competitor AFP flew to Tampa, Florida, thinking he had won, though he had not. The resulting publicity caused more lawsuits for both companies. PCH reached a $30 million national settlement in 1999. In 2000, another $18 million settlement was reached with 24 states, after the company sent mass mailings that said "You are a winner!" and used mock personalized checks. PCH agreed to avoid similar mailings in the future, and add a "sweepstakes fact box" to mailings.

State attorneys spoke out against the national settlement from 2000 and additional lawsuits were filed by individual states. Another $34 million settlement was reached in 2001 in a lawsuit involving 25 states, bringing the total settlements since 1999 to $82 million. As part of the settlement, PCH was required to avoid terms like "Guaranteed Winner," add disclaimers to mailings saying that the recipient has not won and that purchasing merchandise won't increase their chances. PCH reached settlements with all fifty states and agreed to work with a "compliance counsel." PCH apologized in the settlement and said it would contact customers who had spent more than $1,000 on merchandise the prior year.

PCH also reached an agreement with Iowa in 2007. In 2010 the company paid $3.5 million to the attorneys general of 32 states and the District of Columbia to settle possible contempt charges that it had violated the terms of the 2001 agreement. The company denied wrongdoing, but agreed to work with both an ombudsman and a compliance counsel who would review its mailings quarterly.

In April 2014, an investigation by the Senate Special Committee on Aging concluded that PCH had "pushed the limits" of prior agreements and that additional legislation may be needed.

Online development 
PCH began selling merchandise in 1985 with two products. After a Hershey's Chocolate Cookbook and a diet cookbook sold more than other products, the company began expanding into jewelry, media, collectibles, household products, and others. The company also shifted its focus online. It began selling magazine subscriptions and merchandise on PCH.com in 1996. In 2006, it acquired Blingo Inc., an ad-supported metasearch engine that was later re-branded as PCH Search and Win. PCH ran contests on Twitter, Facebook, and Myspace. iPhone apps for slot games and trivia were developed. The company created online play-and-win sites like PCH Games (formerly Candystand) and PCHQuiz4Cash, with air-hockey and video poker games.

In December 2010, PCH acquired Funtank and its online gaming site Candystand.com. In 2011, PCH promoted a "$5,000 every week for life" sweepstakes in TV ads and the front page of AOL.com. The following year the company acquired a mobile marketing company, Liquid Wireless. The company utilized, then stopped then started again utilizing coregistration (through other websites) to expand its customer base.

In 2008, a PCH spokesperson said the digital properties were intended to attract younger consumers. By 2013, the internet had become PCH's primary channel of interaction with consumers. The New York Times described the digital transition as "part of an overall effort to collect information on Web users, show them advertisements and use the registration information for PCH’s mailing lists."

In 2020, PCH acquired digital publisher Wide Open Media Group, publisher of websites Wide Open Spaces, Wide Open Country, and FanBuzz.

Products 
PCH is a direct-marketing company that sells merchandise and magazine subscriptions and operates several prize-based websites. While best known for the sweepstakes and Prize Patrol it uses to promote its magazine subscriptions, the majority of the company's revenue now comes from merchandise. The company has been selling books, media, jewelry, and other consumer items since the 1980s. PCH operates eight websites, including PCH Search and Win, PCH Lotto, PCH Games, PCH Save and Win, and Candystand.

The company also sells magazine subscriptions at a discount and advertises subscriptions along with its sweepstakes. It's estimated that companies like PCH keep 75 to 90 percent of the fees from the original subscription, while publishers use the increased distribution to improve circulation numbers and revenue from renewals. PCH popularized the idea of using sweepstakes to sell magazine subscriptions in the direct-marketing market and became known by detractors as a producer of junk mail for advertising through mass-mailings. Documents filed with the New York State Department in 1993 said that year the company mailed 220 million envelopes. Frequent buyers can receive 30 to 40 mailings a year.

Sweepstakes 

Although PCH advertises its sweepstakes along with magazine subscriptions, no purchase is necessary to enter or win. In 1995, PCH began the tradition of announcing winners of its $10 million prize just after the Super Bowl. As of 2012, $225 million in prizes have been distributed. Some of its larger prizes are for $5,000 a week for life, or $10 million. Prizes can also range from $1 Amazon gift cards to $2,500, $1 million or $3 million. The larger cash prizes are paid in installments, typically with a balloon payment at 30 years, reducing the present value of prizes to much less than their nominal values.

Odds of winning 
According to the official rules, as of June 2020, the odds of winning "$5,000 a Week for Life" in Giveaway 16000 are 1 in 6.2 billion.

Prize Patrol 
The Prize Patrol surprises sweepstakes winners at their homes, work, or other locations with cash prizes and captures the event on video. Since their introduction in 1989, these reality TV-style videos of prize-winners surprised at their doorstep with checks for $1,000 to $10 million have been used in widely broadcast television commercials, and, more recently, in the company's online acquisition efforts, websites and social media communications. In 2013, a $5 million television campaign modified the traditional prize patrol commercial by digitally altering video from classic sitcoms like The Brady Bunch and Gilligan's Island to show the prize patrol visiting characters in the show.  Major winners are never contacted in advance; any letters, telephone calls, and social media messages claiming that a person may have already won a major prize, or claiming that they need to pay a fee to collect the prize, are always scams.

The Prize Patrol has made in-person appearances or delivered prizes on TV programs such as The Oprah Winfrey Show, The Price Is Right, and Let's Make a Deal. Their surprise winning moments have been spoofed by Jay Leno, Conan O'Brien, and the cast of Saturday Night Live; woven into the plots of movies such as Let's Go to Prison, The Sentinel, and Knight and Day; Early Edition, and the subject of cartoons.

Spokesperson 
In the summer of 2020 Marie Osmond became a spokesperson for PCH with television advertisements, online, and direct-to-home mailings.
In January 2021, Steve Harvey made his debut in television commercials as Publishers Clearing House spokesperson.

Charitable Giving 
Over 40% of net profits are donated to charity.

See also 

 List of New York companies

References

External links 
 

Companies based in Nassau County, New York
Direct marketing
Metasearch engines
Privately held companies based in New York (state)
1953 establishments in New York (state)
Marketing companies established in 1953